Monika Hejtmánková (born 11 May 1967) is a Czech handball player. She competed in the women's tournament at the 1988 Summer Olympics.

References

1967 births
Living people
Czech female handball players
Olympic handball players of Czechoslovakia
Handball players at the 1988 Summer Olympics
Sportspeople from Olomouc